Adrusta Jathakudu is a 1971 Telugu-language drama film, produced and directed by K. Hemambaradhara Rao under the Subhashini Art Pictures banner. It stars N. T. Rama Rao and Vanisri, with music composed by T. Chalapathi Rao.

Plot
Anantharamayiah, a school teacher lives in the village Siripuram along with his two children Prasad (Master Aadinarayana) and Sarada (Baby Sridevi). The Zamindar of the village Raja Raghunath Rao asks him to give back the school land donated by his father and offers a bribe, even threatening him, but Anantaramaiyah does not yield. Hence Ragunatha Rao sets fire to the school building, in which, Anantha Ramaiah dies while protecting the children. Now Prasad & Sarada become orphans and their paternal (Lakshmi Kanthamma) & maternal (Radha Kumari) aunts take one each of them. The maternal aunt Ramanamma harasses Saradha a lot, knowing it, Prasad asks for his sister, but Ramanamma refuses. So, he decides to take care of her, reaches the city, and acquires a job in a mechanic shed owned by Parandhamiah (Dhulipala). Years roll by, and Prasad (N. T. Rama Rao) becomes a chief mechanic, but Sarada is still struggling in the hands of Ramanamma. Meanwhile, Prasad joins as a tenant in the house of retired army officer Eshwar Rao (Raavi Kondala Rao), his daughter Vijaya (Vanisri) loves and marries Prasad. Parallelly, a rich guy Gopal (Rama Krishna) visits the village, and Ramanamma arranges Sarada as a servant to him. Gopal traps Sarada makes her pregnant and absconds. Prasad learns about it and takes an oath that he will settle his sister's life. Prasad brings Sarada with him and Vijaya also wholeheartedly accepts her. After some time, Sarada recognizes Gopal who turns as Parandhamaiah's son but Gopal refuses to accept her when the quarrel arises. Parandhamiah calms them down and ensures Prasad that he will accept Sarada as his daughter-in-law. After that, Parandhamiah traps Prasad in a false case and sends him to jail. After release, Prasad challenges Parandhamaiah that he will make them realize their mistake, by the time, Sarada gives birth to a baby boy. At that point, a beggar like an old man (Nagabhushanam) tries to commit suicide. Prasad saves him, brings him home, and treats him as his father. Suddenly, the beggar turns into Raja Raghunatha Rao, who came in disguise to test the characters of Prasad and his family. Then he explains his sin for which he has lost everyone in his life. Now he adopts Prasad and gives him his entire property. At last, Prasad in various forms of disguise teaches a lesson to Parandhamiah & Gopal and reforms them. Finally, the movie ends on a happy note.

Cast
N. T. Rama Rao as Prasad
Vanisri as Vijaya
Nagabhushanam as Raja Raghunatha Rao
Mikkilineni as Subbaramaiah
Dhulipala as Parandhamaiah 
Ramakrishna as Gopal
Padmanabham as Brahmam  
Allu Ramalingaiah as Ananda Rao 
Raavi Kondala Rao as Captain Eeswar Rao 
Sakshi Ranga Rao as Govinda Rao
Potti Prasad as Papaiah 
Chidatala Appa Rao as Venkata Swamy 
Jagga Rao as Tadigala Tatabbai
Radha Kumari as Ramanamma
Suma as Sharada
Lakshmi Kantamma
Jyothi Lakshmi as item number
Master Adinarayana as Young Prasad 
Baby Sridevi as Young Sharada
Chalapathi Rao as Doctor

Soundtrack

Music composed by T. Chalapathi Rao.

References

Indian drama films
Films scored by T. Chalapathi Rao
1970s Telugu-language films
1971 drama films